Dar-e Dask (also Romanized as Dar-e Desk and Dardesk; also known as Dar Dar, Dardez, and Dar-e Dashk) is a village in Saghder Rural District, Jebalbarez District, Jiroft County, Kerman Province, Iran. At the 2006 census, its population was 460, in 69 families.

References 

Populated places in Jiroft County